The Chaldean Catholic Eparchy (Diocese) of Saint Thomas the Apostle U.S.A. is the sole eparchy (Eastern Catholic diocese) of the Chaldean Catholic Church sui iuris (Syro-Oriental Rite in Syriac/Aramaic languages) for the eastern half of the United States and is exempt, i.e. immediately subject to the Holy See, not part of an ecclesiastical province.

Its cathedral episcopal see is Our Lady of Chaldeans Cathedral, located in Southfield, Michigan, United States.

History 
It was created by Pope John Paul II on January 11, 1982 as the Apostolic Exarchate of United States of America for the Chaldeans, covering the entire United States.
 
It was elevated to an eparchy, an Eastern-rite Catholic diocese, led by an eparch (bishop) on August 3, 1985.

On 21 May 2002 it lost vast territory to establish the Chaldean Catholic Eparchy of Saint Peter the Apostle of San Diego.

Bishops
(all Chaldean Rite)

Episcopal ordinaries
Apostolic Exarch of United States of America 
 Ibrahim Namo Ibrahim (1982.01.11 – 1985.08.03 see below), Titular Bishop of Anbar of the Chaldeans (January 11, 1982 – 1985.08.03)

Exempt Eparchs (Bishops) of Saint Thomas the Apostle of Detroit
 Ibrahim Namo Ibrahim (1985.08.03 - retired May 3, 2014)
 Francis Y. Kalabat (June 14, 2014 - ...)

Other priest of this eparchy who became bishop
 Emmanuel Hanna Shaleta (Challita), appointed Bishop of Mar Addai of Toronto (Chaldean), Canada in 2015

Parishes and Missions

Churches
Mother of God Chaldean Catholic Cathedral,       Southfield, Michigan
Holy Cross Chaldean Catholic Church, Farmington Hills, Michigan
Holy Martyrs Chaldean Catholic Church,     Sterling Heights, Michigan
Mar Addai Chaldean Catholic Church,                 Oak Park, Michigan
Our Lady of Perpetual Help Chaldean Catholic Church, Warren, Michigan
Sacred Heart Chaldean Catholic Church,                Warren, Michigan
St. George Chaldean Catholic Church,          Shelby Township, Michigan
St. Joseph Chaldean Catholic Church ,                    Troy, Michigan
St. Paul Chaldean Catholic Church,                Grand Blanc, Michigan
St. Thomas Chaldean Catholic Church,          West Bloomfield, Michigan
Mart Mariam Chaldean Catholic Church,             Northbrook, Illinois
St. Ephrem Chaldean Catholic Church,                    Chicago, Illinois

Missions
Chaldean Catholic Mission  in  Wayland, Massachusetts
Chaldean Catholic Mission  in Jacksonville, Florida

Religious centers
Our Lady of the Fields Camp and Retreat Center, Brighton, Michigan
Eastern Catholic Re-Evangelization Center (ECRC), Bloomfield Township, Michigan

Monasteries and convents
Our Lady of Chaldeans Sisters Convent, Farmington Hills, Michigan

References

External links
 Chaldean Catholic Eparchy of Detroit Official Site Monasteries, convents 
 Giga-Catholic Information

Assyrian-American culture in Illinois
Assyrian-American culture in Michigan
Chaldean Catholic Church in the United States
Iraqi-American history
Saint Thomas the Apostle of Detroit
Saint Thomas the Apostle of Detroit
Saint Thomas the Apostle of Detroit
Eastern Catholicism in Michigan
1982 establishments in Michigan